The  is the largest branch of the Yoshino River and flows through Ehime and Tokushima prefectures in Japan. Its name was derived from the Besshi copper mine that is now closed. In Tokushima Prefecture, it is called the Iyo River (伊予川 Iyo-gawa).

Geography
The rivers originates Mount Kanmuri on the borders of Ehime and Kōchi prefectures. It then flows through Shikokuchūō in Ehime Prefecture and Miyoshi in Tokushima Prefecture, before joining with the Yoshino River.

History
In 1900, poisons from the various minerals excavated at the nearby copper mine seeped into the river, poisoning the local populations downstream.

References

Rivers of Ehime Prefecture
Rivers of Tokushima Prefecture
Rivers of Japan